The 2013 Albanian demonstrations in Macedonia was a wave of violent protests and a period of ethnic tensions among the Albanian minority in Macedonia in March 2013 over an controversial appointment of former ethnic Albanian guerrilla commander Talat Xhaferi as the country’s defence minister.

History
Twenty-two people were injured during fighting between demonstrators and police as the military was sent in to quell the rioting and ethnic tensions that flared over the next few days. Protests rocked villages and Albanian-majority streets, where demonstrators threw stones at police who later fired tear gas to disperse protesters. Rallies, Demonstrations, Marches and Protest unrest was organised among Albanian youths and young people. Rioters set fire on stations and pelted stones after reports that ethnic Albanians were attacked during youth-led protests in Macedonia against he appointment of the Albanian defence minister.

Thick plum of smoke arose in Skopje after cars was set alight and protesters was attacked by the military. Rioters was met with tear gas and live shots, tanks pushed protesters off the streets. Mobs kept attacking the police cars and ethnic Macedonians staged protests and thousands participated in rival rallies and demonstrations in the country. Protesters continued protests and rioting over the next few days amid violence and widespread attacks by police and violence between police and ethnic groups on both sides. Albanian demonstrators said they were hooligans who staged rallies for the days before the uprising but protesters (Macedonians) said they were ordinary youth. 1 was critically wounded and 22 were injured in the battles.

See also
 2014 Albanian demonstrations in the Republic of Macedonia

References

2013 protests
2013 riots